Egy Maulana Vikri (born 7 July 2000) is an Indonesian professional footballer who plays as a winger for Liga 1 club Dewa United and the Indonesia national team.
In 2017, Egy was named as one of the 60 most talented and promising players born in the year 2000 by The Guardian.

Club career

Early career
Egy comes from a family of footballers. His father coached at SSB Tasbi, a football school in Medan where Egy began to play, while his older brother Yusrizal Muzakki has played for lower league teams in Indonesia. At SSB Tasbi, Egy participated in the Grassroots Indonesian U-12 Tournament in 2012. His raw talent was noticed by the Indonesian national talent scouts. At that time, Egy helped his team to become the champions of that tournament and also ended up as the top scorer. After primary school, he went to the Special Sports School, a government secondary school for talented athletes in the Ragunan area of South Jakarta or better known as SKO Ragunan. In 2016, Egy was part of an Indonesian youth team that became the champion in the Gothia Cup event in Sweden. He won the best player award of the 2016 Gothia Cup tournament after bagging a total of 28 goals along the way.

His talent increasingly attracted international media attention when he played for the Indonesia U-19 team that represented Asia in the renowned Festival International Espoirs - Tournoi Maurice Revello or better known as the Toulon Tournament for youth teams from 29 May to 10 June 2017. While his team lost all of its group matches, Egy won the prestigious Jouer Revelation Trophée for being the breakout player in the tournament, an award previously won by footballers who later became world stars, including Cristiano Ronaldo and Zinedine Zidane. 

He continued to shine in September 2017. Egy became the top scorer of the 2017 AFF U-19 Youth Championship with eight goals for the Indonesia U-19 team.

By the end of 2017, there was a race to be the first professional team to sign Egy, who received interests from many non-Indonesian teams, including Thai League 2 club Chainat Hornbill that promised to organize a number of trials for Egy with some German clubs by the end of 2018. However, Egy's sight was squarely on Europe after his successes in youth tournaments in Sweden and France.

Europe trials
Egy received trial offers from a number of European clubs including Benfica, Sporting CP, Getafe CF, Espanyol, Legia Warsaw, Saint-Étienne, Ajax Amsterdam and some Italian clubs.
However, he eventually chose Polish club Lechia Gdańsk, which took him in without any trials needed even when Egy had no experience being part of any professional club.

Lechia Gdańsk
On 11 March 2018, Egy officially joined Lechia Gdańsk on a three–year deal, joining the team on his 18th birthday. He was handed the number 10 shirt, triggering hype in Poland and Indonesia. He made his first-team debut on 22 December 2018 as a substitute in a match against Gornik Zabrze. Egy played in the 2019 Polish SuperCup final against Piast Gliwice, coming on as a substitute in a match that Lechia won 3–1. On 30 June 2021, Egy's three-year contract has expired and his club chose not to renew his contract.

Senica
On 30 August 2021, Egy completed a move to Slovakian club Senica on a six-month contract, with an option to extend further for one-and-a-half-year. Egy made his debut on 12 September 2021 at Štadión FK Senica, coming on in the 59th-minute, he provided an assist in a 1–0 league win against Pohronie. Egy made his first start on 22 September 2021, in a league cup game against TJ Nafta Gbely, as Senica won 3–0, with Egy assisting the first goal. Egy scored his first goal on 27 November in a league match against MSK Zilina. The match was postponed at half-time while the score was 1–1, due to heavy blizzard condition. Three-days later, he scored another goal in the continuation match, as his team drew 2–2.
 Due to his performance, He was named as Fortuna Liga Team of The Week, and was voted as the best AFC International Player of The Week.

In May 2022, Egy has terminated his contract with Senica, due to financial crisis the club is having. It was also reported that the club had not paid player salaries.

ViOn Zlaté Moravce
On 9 August 2022, Slovakian club ViOn Zlaté Moravce announced that they had signed Egy on a one-year contract. On 13 August 2022, Egy made his debut by coming on as a substitute in a 1–0 loss to Žilina in the Slovak Super Liga. Despite coming on as a substitute, He was taken off at the 83rd minute. On 20 August 2022, two-minutes after coming on as a 60th minute substitute, Egy set-up Tomáš Horák's goal in an eventual 2–2 draw against Ružomberok. On 15 December 2022, Egy terminated his contract with ViOn after mutual agreement.

Dewa United
On 30 January 2023, Egy officially joined Liga 1 side Dewa United on a permanent deal. Three days later, Egy made his league debut for the club, also scored his first league goal in a 1–1 draw against Madura United at the Indomilk Arena, Tangerang. Six days later, he coming as a starter and give his first assists a winning goal in the 12 minute by Majed Osman in Dewa United's 1–0 win over Borneo Samarinda.

International career

Youth

Egy played for Indonesia throughout youth levels in the Indonesia U-14, Indonesia U-16, Indonesia U-19, and Indonesia U-23 teams.

He made his debut and first goal for Indonesia U-16 in a friendly match against Vietnam U-16 in December 2014, one year before Indonesia's FIFA suspension in 2015. Weeks before the suspension, Egy scored two goals in a friendly match against Japan U-16 in April 2015.

He made his debut for the Indonesia U-19 team in the 2017 Toulon Tournament on 31 May 2017 against Brazil U20. His impressive performance at the tournament earned him the Breakthrough Player of the Tournament. He made his debut for the Indonesia U-23 in a friendly match against the Syria U-23 on 16 November 2017 where he came on as a substitute.

Senior
Egy made his debut for the senior Indonesian national in a friendly match against Iceland on 14 January 2018. He came as substitute at second half replacing Osvaldo Haay.  At the end of his Poland career, he received a call to join the senior Indonesian national football team again in May 2021. He scored his first international goal in a 25 May 2021 friendly match in Dubai against Afghanistan.

Egy was also part of the Indonesia national under-23 football team that won silver in the 2019 Southeast Asian Games, in which he scored three goals.

On 11 October 2021, he made first official international goal against Chinese Taipei in a 2023 AFC Asian Cup qualification – Play-off Round leg 2 match, in which Indonesia won 3–0. On 25 December 2021, he made his debut in a 2020 AFF Championship and also scored against Singapore in the second leg of semi-final in a 4–2 victory after extra-time. He scored again against  Thailand in the second leg of the final in a 2–2 draw, avoiding another loss to Thailand.

Egy scored two goals in the 2022 AFF Championship tournament.

Career statistics

Club

International appearances

International goals 
International under-23 goals

International senior goals

Honours
Lechia Gdańsk
 Polish SuperCup: 2019
Polish Cup: 2018–19

Indonesia U19
 AFF U-19 Youth Championship third place: 2017, 2018
Indonesia U23
 Southeast Asian Games 
 Silver medal: 2019
 Bronze medal: 2021
 Aceh World Solidarity Cup runner-up: 2017
Indonesia
 AFF Championship runner-up: 2020

Individual
 Fortuna liga Goal Of The Month: November 2021
 AFF U-19 Youth Championship Top Goalscorer: 2017 
 AFF U-19 Youth Championship Best Player: 2017
 Toulon Tournament Breakthrough Player: 2017

References

External links
 Egy Maulana at PSSI
 Egy Maulana at Lechia Gdańsk

2000 births
Living people
Sportspeople from Medan
Indonesian footballers
Indonesia youth international footballers
Indonesia international footballers
Association football forwards
Association football wingers
Lechia Gdańsk players
FK Senica players
Ekstraklasa players
Slovak Super Liga players
Indonesian expatriate footballers
Competitors at the 2019 Southeast Asian Games
Southeast Asian Games silver medalists for Indonesia
Southeast Asian Games medalists in football
Expatriate footballers in Poland
Indonesian expatriate sportspeople in Poland
Expatriate footballers in Slovakia
Indonesian expatriate sportspeople in Slovakia
Competitors at the 2021 Southeast Asian Games